Brian E. Dalrymple   is an Ontarian fingerprint scientist known for introducing for the first time the use of lasers (with colleague Duff and Menzel) as a forensic light sources for fingerprints and other evidence detection, using the Argon Ion Lasers to detect the inherent fluorescence of the latent fingerprints and finding fluorescing evidence. That was the beginning of a real revolution in the forensic identification field.  Brian Dalrymple also become the first to use this forensic technique on a real case.

Biography
Brian Ellsworth Dalrymple is born in Toronto on September 23, 1947.  He get his baccalaureate in 1970 from Ontario College of Art. He worked for twenty-eight years at the Ontario Provincial Police before retiring.  He begin at the OPP as a forensic analyst in 1972. During his career, he contribute numerous articles to industry magazines and journals and made a lot of training around the world. He is a member of the International Fingerprint Research Group (IFRG), to which are invited only the most active and creative researchers of the domain.

Work
In 1977 start a collaboration between Brian Dalrymple and the Xerox Research Centre to develop a new method of using an argon ion laser to detect fingerprints by inherent fluorescence. The OPP became the first police agency in the world to use this new technology on a regular basis.  The laser technique is a non-destructive method that allow the use of other fingerprint detection following the laser observation.  This use of the laser also lead to the use of new staining chemicals on fingerprint to render them fluorescent.  This technique can also detect fingerprints that could not be revealed by other methods.

Awards

 Included in the prestigious Canadian Who's Who, Canada 
 1980 - John A. Dondero Award  (International Association for Identification, US)
 1980 - The Award of Merit (American Institute of Applied Science, US)
 1982 - Edward Foster Award (Canadian Identification Society, Can)
 1984 - Lewis Marshall Award (Fingerprint Society, UK)
 2011 - Distinguished Member (International Association for Identification, US)

Books
 Nafte, M; Dalrymple, B. Crime and Measurement: Methods in Forensic Investigation, Carolina Academic Press, Durham, NC, 2011
 Dalrymple, B. The Skin of Murder Victims: Fingerprints and Other Evidence, Carolina Academic Press, Durham, NC, 2014
 Dalrymple, B. Finding Evidence with Chemistry and Light, 2009
 Dalrymple, B. Finding Evidence with Chemistry and Light, Rev. 2013

References

External links
Brian Dalrymple and Associates

Canadian forensic scientists
Living people
1947 births